John S. McCain may refer to:

People
 John S. McCain Sr. (1884–1945), United States Navy admiral
 John S. McCain Jr. (1911–1981), United States Navy admiral and son of John S. McCain Sr.
 John S. McCain III (1936–2018), United States Navy captain, American statesman, politician, and son of John S. McCain Jr.

Ships
 , a U.S. Navy ship name
 , a Mitscher-class destroyer in the United States Navy from 1953 to 1978
 , an Arleigh Burke-class destroyer in the United States Navy since 1994

See also
 John McCain (disambiguation)

McCain, John S.